Thomas Madden may refer to:
Thomas F. Madden (born 1960), American historian
Thomas Madden (priest) (1853–1915), Archdeacon of Liverpool
Tommy Madden (1883–1930), baseball player
Bunny Madden (Thomas Francis Madden, 1882–1954), baseball player
Thomas M. Madden (1907–1976), U.S. federal judge
Thomas J. Madden (born 1938), American author and public relations expert
Thomas More Madden (1838–1902), Irish physician and writer
Tommy Madden (soccer) (born 1997), American soccer player